The 2018–19 UAE President's Cup was the 43rd edition of the UAE President's Cup, a football cup competition of the United Arab Emirates. The winner qualified for the 2020 AFC Champions League.

Preliminary round
In the preliminary round, ten teams were divided into two groups of five.

Group A

Group B

Bracket
As per UAE Football Association matches database:

Round of 16

Quarter-finals

Semi-finals

Final

References

UAE President's Cup seasons
UAE
President's Cup